Dyspessa serica is a species of moth of the family Cossidae. It is found in Iran.

References

Moths described in 1938
Dyspessa
Moths of Asia